Matthew Rohrer (born 1970) is an American poet.

Born in Ann Arbor, Michigan, Rohrer was raised in Oklahoma. He earned a BA from the University of Michigan (where he won a Hopwood Award for poetry) and a Master of Fine Arts degree in poetry from the University of Iowa.

His first book of poetry, A Hummock in the Malookas (1995), was selected by Mary Oliver for the 1994 National Poetry Series. In 2005, his collection A Green Light was shortlisted for the International Griffin Poetry Prize. James Tate said of A Green Light, "There are poems in A Green Light that can break your heart with their unexpected twists and turns. You think you know where you are and then you don't and it is inexplicably sad. You experience some kind of emotion that you can't even name, but it's deep and real. That's the power of Matthew Rohrer's new poems."

He was a co-founder and poetry editor for Fence magazine.

He lives in Brooklyn, New York and teaches at New York University.

Bibliography
The Sky Contains the Plans (Wave Books, 2020)
The Others (Wave Books, 2017)
Surrounded by Friends (Wave Books, 2015)
Destroyer and Preserver (Wave Books, 2011)
A Plate of Chicken (Ugly Duckling Presse, 2009)
Rise Up (Wave Books, 2007)
A Green Light (Verse Press, 2004)
Nice Hat.  Thanks. (Verse Press, 2002) – with Joshua Beckman
Satellite (Verse Press, 2001)
A Hummock in the Malookas (1995)

Discography
Adventures While Preaching the Gospel of Beauty (2003) – with Joshua Beckman

References

External links
Matthew Rohrer's Author Page at Wave books
Fence magazine
Two poems and an interview with Tao Lin
Three poems (with Joshua Beckman)
Griffin Poetry Prize reading, including video clip 
Griffin Poetry Prize keynote speech
From Town to Town They Go, A Busload of Poets, Rhymes in Tow, The New York Sun
Matthew Rohrer at The Emergency Reading Series

1970 births
Living people
American male poets
Iowa Writers' Workshop alumni
University of Michigan alumni
21st-century American poets
Hopwood Award winners
Writers from Brooklyn
Writers from Ann Arbor, Michigan
21st-century American male writers